is a Japanese football player for FC Gifu.

Club statistics
Updated to end of 2018 season.

References

External links
Profile at FC Gifu
Profile at Renofa Yamaguchi FC

1989 births
Living people
Senshu University alumni
Association football people from Shizuoka Prefecture
Japanese footballers
J1 League players
J2 League players
J3 League players
Japan Football League players
FC Machida Zelvia players
Renofa Yamaguchi FC players
FC Gifu players
Vegalta Sendai players
Kyoto Sanga FC players
Association football midfielders